Everett W. Swank (February 17, 1913 – June 1, 2000) was an American professional basketball player. He played for the Indianapolis Kautskys in the National Basketball League and averaged 1.5 points per game.

References

1913 births
2000 deaths
United States Army personnel of World War II
American men's basketball players
Basketball players from Indiana
Forwards (basketball)
Guards (basketball)
High school basketball coaches in the United States
Indianapolis Greyhounds men's basketball players
Indianapolis Kautskys players
People from Pulaski County, Indiana